The Botswana men's national squash team represents Botswana in international squash team competitions, and is governed by Botswana Squash Rackets Association.

Current team
 Alister Walker
 Lekgotla Mosope
 Jason Boyle
 Theo Pelonomi

Results

World Team Squash Championships

See also 
 Botswana Squash Rackets Association
 World Team Squash Championships

References 

Squash teams
Men's national squash teams
Squash
Squash in Botswana
Men's sport in Botswana